This is a list of Swedish-speaking Finns.

To be included in this list, the person must have a Wikipedia article showing they are a Swedish-speaking Finn or must have references showing they are a Swedish-speaking Finn and are notable.

Actors, directors & filmmakers 

 
Ida Aalberg – actor (1857–1915)
Irina Björklund – actor and singer (1973– )
Jörn Donner – writer, film director, actor, producer, politician, and founder of Finnish Film Archive (1933–2020)
Stina Ekblad – actor (1954– )
Klaus Härö – filmmaker (1971– )
Nicke Lignell – actor, voice actor, and television host (1966– )
Åke Lindman – director and actor (1928–2009)
Lasse Pöysti – actor, director, theatre manager, and writer (1927–2019)
Birgitta Ulfsson – actor and theatre director (1928–2017)
Casper Wrede – theatre and film director (1929–1998)

Architects 

Kristian Gullichsen (1932–2021)
Anton Werner Lignell (1867–1954)
Viljo Revell (1910–1964)
Lars Sonck (1870–1956)

Artists and designers 

 
Erik Bruun – graphic designer (1926– )
Fanny Churberg – painter (1845–1892)
Albert Edelfelt – painter (1854–1905)
Magnus Enckell – painter (1870–1925)
Kaj Franck – industrial designer, artistic director, and instructor of applied arts (1911–1989)
Akseli Gallen-Kallela – painter (1865–1931)
Jorma Gallen-Kallela – painter (1898–1939)
Eero Järnefelt – painter (1863–1937)
Rudolf Koivu – illustrator (1890–1946)
Stefan Lindfors – industrial designer, interior designer, film-maker, and sculptor (1962– )
Helene Schjerfbeck – painter (1862–1946)
Hugo Simberg – painter (1873–1917)
Kaj Stenvall – painter (1951– )
Beda Stjernschantz – painter (1867–1910)

Businesspeople 

Antti Ahlström – industrialist, founder of Ahlstrom (1827–1896)
Kaj Arnö – CEO of the MariaDB Foundation (1963– )
Karl Fazer – founder of confectionery manufacturer Fazer and Olympic sport-shooter (1866–1932)
Rabbe Grönblom – founder of Kotipizza, RG Line, Omenahotelli (1950–2015)
Hjallis Harkimo – chairman of the board of Jokerit (1953– )
Fredrik Idestam – industrialist, founder of Nokia (1838–1916)
Mikael Lilius – ex-CEO of Fortum (1948– )
Mårten Mickos – ex-CEO of MySQL AB, currently CEO at HackerOne (1962– )
 – founder of the Stockmann department store (1825–1906)
Björn Wahlroos – Chairman of the Board in Sampo plc, Nordea and UPM-Kymmene Oyj (1952– )

Musicians

Opera
Monica Groop – mezzo-soprano (1958– )

Classical
Paavo Berglund – conductor and violinist (1929–2012)
Erik Bergman – composer (1911–2006)
Bernhard Crusell – clarinetist, composer, and translator (1775–1838)
Mikko Franck – conductor and violinist (1978– )
Ralf Gothoni – pianist and conductor (1946– )
Magnus Lindberg – composer and pianist (1958– )
Linda Lampenius (stage name Linda Brava) – concert violinist; also known for work as a model, actress, member of the Helsinki City Council, and Sports 2000 rally driver (1970– )
Ossi Runne – trumpeter, orchestra leader, composer, and record producer (1927–2020)
Leif Segerstam – conductor, composer, violinist, violist, and pianist (1944– )
Jean Sibelius – composer (1865–1957)
John Storgårds – violinist and conductor (1963– )
Martin Wegelius – composer and musicologist (1846–1906)

Various genres

Ami Aspelund – singer (1953– )
Monica Aspelund – singer (1946– )
Henrik Otto Donner – composer, musician, trumpeter, record producer, and music personality (1939–2013)
Axel Ehnström (stage name Paradise Oskar) – singer-songwriter (1990– )
Janina Fry  – pop singer, model, and television host (1973– )
Ben Granfelt – guitarist; best known for work with the Ben Granfelt Band, Leningrad Cowboys, and Wishbone Ash (1963– )
Kim Herold – singer-songwriter (1979– )
Jan "Katla" Jämsen – co-founder, songwriter, and former singer of folk metal band Finntroll (– )
Pernilla Karlsson – singer (1990– )
Mathias "Vreth" Lillmåns – metal vocalist and bassist; best known for work with Finntroll (1982– )
André Linman – songwriter, rock singer and guitarist; best known for work with Sturm Und Drang (1992– )
Georg Malmstén – singer, musician, composer, and conductor (1902–1981)
Patrik Mennander – metal and rock singer; best known for work with Ruoska, Battlelore, and Natsipaska (1976– )
Kristian Meurman – singer (1979– )
Nasty Suicide (born Jan-Markus Stenfors) – guitarist, bass guitarist, and singer; best known for work with glam rock band Hanoi Rocks (1963– )
Mathias "Warlord" Nygård – co-founder and lead vocalist of metal band Turisas (1982– )
Krista Siegfrids – pop singer (1985– )
Gösta Sundqvist – lead singer, composer, and lyricist of Leevi and the Leavings and a radio-personality (1957–2003)
Jenny Wilhelms – composer and musician focused on Nordic vocal and fiddling traditions; lead singer of folk and world music band Gjallarhorn (1974– )

Politicians 

Claes Andersson – member of parliament, 1987 to 1999 and 2007 to 2008, and Minister of Culture, 1995 to 1999 (1937–2019)
Li Andersson – member of parliament since 2015; leader of the Left Alliance since 2016; and Minister of Education since 2019 (1987– )
Jan-Erik Enestam – member of parliament, 1991 to 2007; Minister of the Interior, 1995 to 1999; Minister of Defense, 1995 and 1999 to 2003; Minister of the Environment, 2003 to 2006 (1947– )
Axel Olof Freudenthal – philologist and academic, considered by the Swedish People's Party to be their spiritual father (1836–1911)
Karl-August Fagerholm – three-time Prime Minister of Finland during the late-1940s and 1950s (1901–1984)
Carl Haglund – member of the European Parliament, 2009 to 2012; Minister of Defence, 2012 to 2015; leader of the Swedish People's Party, 2012 to 2016; and member of parliament, 2015 to 2016 (1979– )
Anna-Maja Henriksson – member of parliament since 2007; Minister of Justice, 2011–2015 and since 2019; and leader of the Swedish People's Party since 2016 (1964– )
Tony Halme – member of parliament, 2003 to 2007; MMA fighter, boxer, sports entertainer and professional wrestler (1963–2010)
Bjarne Kallis – member of parliament, 1991 to 2011, and chairman of the Christian Democratic Party, 1995 to 2004 (1945– )
Henrik Lax – member of parliament, 1987 to 2004, and member of the European Parliament, 2004 to 2009 (1946– )
Axel Lille – member of the Diet of Finland, 1885 to 1900; principal founder of the Swedish People's Party in 1906; member of parliament, 1916 to 1917; journalist and editor (1848–1921)
Gustaf Mannerheim – Regent of Finland, 1918 to 1919; commander-in-chief, 1939 to 1945; and President of Finland, 1944 to 1946 (1867–1951)
Elisabeth Rehn – member of parliament, 1979 to 1995; leader of the Swedish People's Party, 1987 to 1990; Minister of Defense, 1990 to 1995; member of the European Parliament, 1995 to 1996; and diplomat to the United Nations (1935– )
Johan Vilhelm Snellman – member of the Senate of Finland, Fennoman philosopher, author, and journalist (1806–1881)
Alexander Stubb – member of European Parliament, 2004 to 2008; member of parliament, 2011 to 2017; Minister for Foreign Affairs, 2008 to 2011; Minister for Foreign Trade and Development, 2011 to 2014; leader of the National Coalition Party, 2014 to 2016; Minister of Finance, 2015 to 2016; and 43rd Prime Minister of Finland, 2014 to 2015 (1968– )
Ulf Sundqvist – member of parliament, 1970 to 1983; Minister of Education, 1972 to 1975; Minister of Trade and Industry, 1979 to 1981; head of the National Workers' Savings Bank, 1982 to 1991; and leader of the Social Democratic Party of Finland, 1991 to 1993 (1945– )
Pehr Evind Svinhufvud – member of the Diet of Finland, 1894 and 1899 to 1906; member of parliament, 1907 to 1908, 1908 to 1914, 1917, and 1930 to 1931; chairman of the Senate of Finland, 1917 to 1918; Regent of Finland in 1918; Prime Minister of Finland, 1930 to 1931; and the 3rd President of Finland, 1931–1937 (1861–1944)
 Carl Olof Tallgren – member of parliament, 1961 to 1975; Minister of Finance, 1970 to 1971; and chairman of the Swedish People's Party, 1974 to 1977 (1927– )
Stefan Wallin – member of parliament, 2007 to 2019; Minister of the Environment in 2007; Minister of Culture and Sport, 2007 to 2011; and Minister of Defence, 2011 to 2012 (1967– )
Theodor Wegelius – member of the Senate of Finland (1850–1932)

Scientists and technologists 

Lars Valerian Ahlfors – mathematician and Fields Medalist in 1936; known for work in the fields of Riemann surfaces and complex analysis (1907–1996)
Erik Allardt – sociologist, professor, and chancellor of the Åbo Akademi University (1925–2020)
Fredrik Elfving – botanist, plant physiologist, and university administrator (1854–1942)
Gustav Elfving – mathematician and statistician; known for pioneering work in the optimal design of experiments (1908–1984)
Kari Enqvist – physicist and professor of cosmology (1954– )
Axel Olof Freudenthal – philologist and academic, considered by the Swedish People's Party to be their spiritual father (1836–1911)
Johan Gadolin – chemist, physicist, and mineralogist; best known for his description of the first rare-earth element, yttrium (1760–1852)
Ragnar Granit – physiologist and professor of neurophysiology; joint Nobel Laureate in Physiology or Medicine in 1967 (1900–1991)
Hilma Granqvist – anthropologist; best known for long field studies of Palestinians (1890–1972)
Pehr Kalm – botanist, naturalist, explorer, and agricultural economist (1716–1779)
Rafael Karsten – social anthropologist and philosopher of religion; best known for work among indigenous peoples of South America (1879–1956)
Anders Johan Lexell – astronomer, mathematician, and physicist; best known for work in the fields of celestial mechanics and polygonometry, particularly spherical trigonometry (1740–1784)
Ernst Lindelöf – mathematician; best known for work in the fields of function theory and topology (1870–1946)
Lorenz Lindelöf – mathematician, astronomer, and researcher of variational calculus; Minister of State Education, 1874–1902 (1827–1908)
Hjalmar Mellin – mathematician; best known for work in the field of function theory and as developer of the integral transform known as the Mellin transform (1854–1933)
Pekka Myrberg – mathematician and university administrator; best known for work in the field of function theory, particularly iteration and period-doubling bifurcation  (1892–1976)
 – mathematician known for his work in the field of minimal surface; member of the Senate of Finland (1851–1917)
Nils Gustaf Nordenskiöld – mineralogist and traveler; best known as discoverer of alexandrite and several other minerals (1792–1866)
Linus Torvalds – creator of Linux kernel (1969– )
Michael Widenius – main developer of MySQL (1962– )
Erik Adolf von Willebrand – physician; best known for his work in the field of hematology (1870–1949)
Edvard Westermarck – sociologist and philosopher; known as "the first sociobiologist," he is best remembered for his work in the field of marriage (1862–1939)
Georg Henrik von Wright – logician and philosopher; best known for work in the fields of analytic philosophy and philosophical logic and, later, morality and philosophical pessimism (1916–2003)

Soldiers 

Adolf Ehrnrooth – general (1905–2004)
Johan Casimir Ehrnrooth – lieutenant-general, Prime Minister of Bulgaria (1833–1913)
Oskar Ferdinand Gripenberg – general of the infantry (1838–1916)
Carl Gustaf Casimir Gripenberg – rear-admiral (1836–1908)
Oskar Ludvig Starck – vice-admiral (1846–1928)
Oskar Wilhelm Enqvist – vice-admiral (1849–1912)
Theodor Kristian Avellan – admiral, Minister of the Navy (1839–1916)
Birger Ek – pilot and Mannerheim Cross Knight
Axel Heinrichs – general (1890–1965)
Ruben Lagus – major general (1896–1956)
Gustaf Erik Magnusson – father of Finnish fighter tactics
Gustaf Mannerheim – marshal of Finland (1867–1951)
Lennart Oesch – lieutenant general (1892–1978)
Harald Öhquist – lieutenant general (1891–1971)
Hugo Österman – lieutenant general (1892–1975)
Georg Magnus Sprengtporten – general (1740–1819)
Torsten Stålhandske – commander of Hakkapelites (1594–1644)
Kurt Martti Wallenius – lieutenant general (1893–1984)
Hans Wind – pilot, twice awarded the Mannerheim Cross

Sportspeople 

Mikael Almén – football player (2000– )
Niklas Bäckström – ice hockey player (1978– )
Sean Bergenheim – ice hockey player (1984– )
Peter Enckelman – football player (1977– )
Adelina Engman – football player (1994– )
Alexei Eremenko – football player (1983– )
Roman Eremenko – football player (1987– )
Sergei Eremenko – football player (1999– )
Marcus Forss – football player (1999– )
Mikael Forssell – football player (1981– )
Albin Granlund – football player (1989– )
Marcus Grönholm – rally driver (1968– )
Tony Halme (stage names Ludvig Borga, Viikinki) – MMA fighter, heavyweight boxer, sports entertainer and professional wrestler, and member of parliament (1963–2010)
Robert Helenius – boxer (1984– )
Janne Holmén – marathon runner (1977– )
Kasper Hämäläinen – football player (1986– )
Mikaela Ingberg – javelin thrower (1974– )
Jonatan Johansson – football player and coach (1975– )
Thomas Johanson – sailor; Olympic gold medalist (1969– )
Benjamin Källman – football player (1998– )
Lucas Lingman – football player (1998– )
Anton Lundell – ice hockey player (2001– )
Joel Mattsson – football player (1999– )
Matilda Nilsson – ice hockey player (1997– )
Fredrik Norrena – ice hockey player (1973– )
Oskar Osala – ice hockey player (1987– )
Mona-Lisa Pursiainen – sprinter (1951–2000)
Alexander Ring – football player (1991– )
Ronja Savolainen – ice hockey player; 2x Olympic bronze medalist (1997– )
Rasmus Schüller – football player (1991– )
Daniel Sjölund – football player (1983– )
Simon Skrabb – football player (1995– )
Tim Sparv – football player (1987– )
Toni Ståhl – football player (1985– )
Toni Söderholm – ice hockey player (1978– )
Peter Tallberg – sailor (1937–2015)
Eva Wahlström – boxer (1980– )

Philosophers, theologians, and clergymen 

Fredrik Gabriel Hedberg
Lauri Ingman
John Vikström
Georg Henrik von Wright – philosopher; best known for work in the fields of analytic philosophy and philosophical logic and, later, morality and pessimism (1916–2003)

Writers 

 – author (1940–2022)
Gunnar Björling – modernist poet (1887–1960)
Bo Carpelan – poet and author (1926–2011)
Fredrika Wilhelmina Carstens – author (1808–1888)
Jörn Donner – author, journalist, critic, filmmaker, politician, and founder of Finnish Film Archive (1933–2020)
Olly Donner – author and anthroposopher (1881–1956)
Monika Fagerholm – novelist (1961– )
Tua Forsström – poet (1947– )
 – science fiction writer (1945–2021)
Bengt Idestam-Almquist (9 September 1895 – 16 September 1983) journalist and the "father of Swedish film criticism"
Tove Jansson – author of the Moomin books (1914–2001)
Irmelin Sandman Lilius – author (1936– )
Fredrika Runeberg – journalist, novelist, and author of historical fiction (1807–1879)
Johan Ludvig Runeberg – lyric and epic poet, considered the national poet of Finland; Lutheran priest (1804–1877)
Johan Vilhelm Snellman – author, journalist, Fennoman philosopher, author, and member of the Senate of Finland (1806–1881)
 – author and songwriter (1929– )
Edith Södergran – modernist poet (1892–1923)
Marton Taiga – pulp fiction author (1907–1969)
Henrik Tikkanen – author (1924–1984)
Märta Tikkanen – author and literary scholar (1935– )
Zacharias Topelius – author and historian (1818–1898)
Nikke Torvalds – journalist (1945– )
Ole Torvalds – journalist (1916–1995)
Solveig von Schoultz – poet and author (1907–1996)
Sara Wacklin – author and educator (1790–1846)
Kjell Westö – author and journalist (1961– )

Other notables 

Ior Bock – mythologist and eccentric (1942–2010)
Sophie Mannerheim – nurse (1863–1928)

Adolf Erik Nordenskiöld – explorer (1832–1901)
Eugen Schauman – civilian who killed Nikolai Ivanovich Bobrikov (1875–1904)
Thomas Wallgren – activist, politician, philosopher
Folke West – traveller

Families
Ahlström family
Donner family

References

 
Swedish-speaking Finns
Swedish-speaking Finns
Swedish